La Martiniere (informally known as LMC) is an elite, independent private day school located in Kolkata (Calcutta), West Bengal. It comprises two single-gender boys and girls schools. It was established in 1836 in accordance with the will of the French soldier of fortune and philanthropist, Major General Claude Martin. They are Christian schools, controlled by the Anglican Church of North India and independent from the government, with English as the primary language of instruction.

La Martiniere Calcutta is often ranked among the best day schools in the country, and has produced a distinguished list of alumni in all walks of Indian and British society. It has an annual meet with La Martiniere Lucknow hosted in September, as well as occasional meets with its sister school La Martiniere Lyon in France.

Notable alumni 

 Jaidip Mukerjea Tennis ('59 batch)
 Mausam Noor Member of Parliament (India) in the Rajya Sabha
 Chhanda Gayen, first Bengali woman to climb Mount Everest
 Leander Paes ('92 batch), tennis: till Class VII only; he transferred thereafter to the Brittania Academy, Madras)
 Sunanda K. Datta-Ray ('54 batch), author, journalist and former editor of The Statesman
 C. K. Birla ('69 batch), Hindustan Motors
 Rajiv Mehrotra ('69 batch), award-winning documentary film maker. iconic 'voice' and television anchor. Managing Trustee, Public Service Broadcasting Trust.
 Jug Suraiya ('62 batch), humourist and journalist
 Pritish Nandy ('63 batch), poet, journalist and film producer.
 Swapan Dasgupta ('71 batch), journalist, political commentator and Member of Parliament.
 Chandan Mitra (gold medalist, '71 batch), Ex-Member of Parliament, owner of The Pioneer newspaper; author of Constant Glory, an authorized history of La Martinière.	
 Paranjoy Guha Thakurta ('71 batch), journalist, Editor of EPW.
 Prannoy Roy, television broadcaster. (till Class V; he transferred thereafter to Doon School, Dehra Dun)
 Suhel Seth ('82 batch), advertising professional and TV personality.
 Catchick Paul Chater (1864 batch), Father of modern Hong Kong, benefactor to the College (Rupees 1.1 million in the 1910s). Chater was a Foundation Scholar.
 Vijay Mallya ('72 batch, Hastings House Captain), Chairman of the United Breweries (UB) Group and ex Rajya Sabha member
 Harshavardhan Neotia, Chairman and CEO, Bengal Ambuja 
 Pramod Bhasin ('75 batch), founder and first CEO of Genpact.
 Hemant Kanoria ('80 batch), founder and chairman of SREI Infrastructure Finance
 John Mason (Good Conduct Medal, '62 batch), educationist. Mason was a Foundation Scholar and later teacher.
 Nirmalya Kumar ('77 batch), business writer, Professor and Director for Aditya V. Birla India Centre at London Business School.
 Ashok Malik ('88 batch), former press secretary to the President of India
 Rajit Gadh, Professor of Mechanical and Aerospace Engineering, University of California, Los Angeles
 Nafisa Ali, actress/ model, Miss India in 1975, also a National Swimming champion
 Bickram Ghosh ('84 batch), tabla pandit
 Merle Oberon ('29 batch), Hollywood actress
 Kiran Rao ('85 batch, plus 2 only), film producer ("Dhobi Ghat")
 Kamakhya Prasad Singh Deo ('61 batch), Union Cabinet minister (Information and Broadcasting) in the 1980s
 Anuvab Pal ('95 batch, School Vice Captain), comedian, author and scriptwriter
 Ramit Tandon ('11 batch), Asian Games'18 squash bronze medalist
 Tapan Singhel, MD & CEO, Bajaj Allianz General Insurance
 Khokhan Sen ('43 batch), India cricketer with 14 Test caps
 Asma Khan ('87 batch), chef/ restauranteur
 Nikhita Gandhi (2010 batch), Indian playback singer
 Sanjoy Narayan (1978 batch), journalist and editor
 Rahil Gangjee ('97 batch), professional golfer
 Aki Narula (‘87 batch), designer

References

External links

 

La Martinière College
Church of North India schools
Schools in Colonial India
Private schools in Kolkata
Christian schools in West Bengal
Primary schools in West Bengal
High schools and secondary schools in Kolkata
Educational institutions established in 1836
1836 establishments in India